The Emir of Qatar Cup is a most Important Cup after Crown prince Cup in Qatar at the top of the Qatari volleyball player. It was founded in 1979.

Champions

References 
 

 

Volleyball competitions in Qatar